"Binsey Poplars" is a poem by Gerard Manley Hopkins (1844–1889), written in 1879. The poem was inspired by the felling of a row of poplar trees near the village of Binsey, northwest of Oxford, England, and overlooking Port Meadow on the bank of the River Thames. The replacements for these trees, running from Binsey north to Godstow, lasted until 2004, when replanting began again.

The Bodleian Library of Oxford University holds a draft manuscript of the poem, handwritten by Hopkins, acquired in 2013.

The poem
The text of the poem is as follows:

See also
 Poplar Walk, Christ Church Meadow

References

External links
 Analysis of 'Binsey Poplars' by Gerard Hopkins on YouTube
 Binsey Poplars — Gerard Manley Hopkins on YouTube

1879 poems
English poems
Works about nature
Culture in Oxford
Culture associated with the River Thames
Populus
1870s individual tree deaths
Environment of Oxfordshire
Destroyed individual trees